A by-election for a Scottish representative peer took place on 1 October 1958 at the Palace of Holyroodhouse in Edinburgh. The election was caused by the death of Archibald Murray, 16th Lord Sinclair. It turned out to be the last by-election for representative peers before all holders of titles in the Peerage of Scotland were made eligible to sit in the House of Lords in 1963.

Procedure
The date, time and place of the meeting was set in a Royal Proclamation of 11 September 1958, issued by the Queen at Balmoral Castle. The Duke of Buccleuch and Queensberry, who held the role of Lord Clerk Register, presided. When the Principal Clerk of Session George Macdonald read the roll of Peers of Scotland, 115 names were read, and 18 answered that they were present - the highest number at a byelection since 1890. Peers present were also asked to produced any proxies for those who were absent, and Lord Saltoun was admitted as a proxy for Lord Sempill. In addition 29 Peers had submitted "Signed Lists" as a form of absent voting.

Unusually the Duke of Buccleuch chose to vote in the election; it was tradition since 1879 for the Lord Clerk Register not to vote, but several previous Lords Clerk Register had broken it.

Result

The 48 voting peers distributed their votes among six peers; after the process had concluded, the Lord Clerk Register noted that the Earl of Mar and Kellie, Lord Sinclair, and Lord Belhaven, "had not in fact been candidates for election".

Votes cast

See also
 List of Scottish representative peers

References

 "MINUTES OF MEETING held on the 1st October, 1958, of PEERS OF SCOTLAND for the ELECTION OF THEIR REPRESENTATIVES to sit and vote in the ensuing Parliament of Great Britain and Northern Ireland." House of Lords paper 5 of Session 1958–59, HMSO.

Peerage of Scotland
Scottish representative peer by-election
Scottish representative peer by-election
Scottish representative peer by-election
Scottish representative peers